Alexei Viktorovich Kasatonov (born 14 October 1959) is a Russian former ice hockey defenceman, who was a long-time member of the Soviet Union national ice hockey team.

Career
On the international stage, Kasatonov won two Olympic gold medals, in 1984 and 1988, and silver in 1980. He won an additional five gold medals at the World Championships in 1981, 1982, 1983, 1986 and 1989.

On the club level, Kasatonov played for SKA Leningrad, CSKA Moscow, New Jersey Devils, Mighty Ducks of Anaheim, St. Louis Blues, and Boston Bruins. He was Anaheim's lone representative in the 1994 National Hockey League All-Star Game. Following a shoulder injury in an American Hockey League (AHL) game for the Providence Bruins in 1996, Kasatonov retired from the NHL and returned to play one last season for his former CSKA Moscow. The severity of the injury led Kasatonov to end his playing career, and he returned to New Jersey to settle down with his wife and son.

In 1998 Kasatonov was the general manager of the Russian Olympic Team that captured the silver medal in Nagano. After the Olympics he began training his son, and soon began coaching youth hockey in the Tri-State area, running his own weekly clinics in Staten Island for seven years. In 2003 Kasatonov founded the Admirals Hockey Club, which at its peak had five teams ranging from Squirts to Juniors. In 2004 Kasatonov accepted the head coaching position at Columbia University.

In 2008 Kasatonov returned to Russia for a head coaching position at PHC Krylya Sovetov. In 2010 Kasatonov was the vice president of CSKA Moscow. In 2011–12, Kasatonov became the vice president and general manager of SKA St. Petersburg - formerly SKA Leningrad - of the Kontinental Hockey League, the first club that he played for in the Soviet Union.

Honours and awards
IIHF Hall of Fame (inducted 2009)
Order "For Merit to the Fatherland", 4th class
Order of Honour
Order of the Red Banner of Labour
Order of the Badge of Honour
Medal "For Distinguished Labour"
NHL All-Star game (1994)

Career statistics

Regular season and playoffs

International

References

External links
 

1959 births
Living people
Ice hockey people from Saint Petersburg
Boston Bruins players
HC CSKA Moscow players
Ice hockey players at the 1980 Winter Olympics
Ice hockey players at the 1984 Winter Olympics
Ice hockey players at the 1988 Winter Olympics
IIHF Hall of Fame inductees
Medalists at the 1984 Winter Olympics
Mighty Ducks of Anaheim players
National Hockey League All-Stars
New Jersey Devils draft picks
New Jersey Devils players
Olympic ice hockey players of the Soviet Union
Olympic gold medalists for the Soviet Union
Olympic medalists in ice hockey
Olympic silver medalists for the Soviet Union
Providence Bruins players
Russian ice hockey coaches
Russian ice hockey defencemen
St. Louis Blues players
SKA Saint Petersburg players
Soviet expatriate ice hockey players
Soviet expatriate sportspeople in the United States
Soviet ice hockey defencemen
Utica Devils players
Medalists at the 1988 Winter Olympics
Medalists at the 1980 Winter Olympics
Honoured Masters of Sport of the USSR
Recipients of the Order "For Merit to the Fatherland", 4th class
Recipients of the Order of Honour (Russia)
Recipients of the Order of the Red Banner of Labour